Frieman is a surname. Notable people with the surname include:

Catherine Frieman (born 1982), American archaeologist and professor
Edward A. Frieman (1926–2013), American physicist
Jonathan Frieman, American political activist
Joshua A. Frieman, theoretical astrophysicist

See also
Freeman (surname)